Poliaenus oregonus is a species of beetle in the family Cerambycidae. It was described by John Lawrence LeConte in 1861. It is known from North America.

References

Pogonocherini
Beetles described in 1861